

176001–176100 

|-id=014
| 176014 Vedrana ||  || Vedrana Ivezic (born 2000), is an American amateur astronomer and the daughter of Croatian-American astrophysicist Željko Ivezić || 
|}

176101–176200 

|-id=103
| 176103 Waynejohnson ||  || Wayne Johnson (born 1953), is an American amateur astronomer, president of the Huachuca Astronomy Club and chair of the western region of the Astronomical League. He discovered several supernovae, and was the first amateur to find two such astronomical objects on the same night. || 
|}

176201–176300 

|-bgcolor=#f2f2f2
| colspan=4 align=center | 
|}

176301–176400 

|-id=380
| 176380 Goran ||  || Goran Ivezic (born 1971), is a Croatian amateur astronomer and the brother of SDSS team member Željko Ivezić. || 
|}

176401–176500 

|-bgcolor=#f2f2f2
| colspan=4 align=center | 
|}

176501–176600 

|-bgcolor=#f2f2f2
| colspan=4 align=center | 
|}

176601–176700 

|-id=610
| 176610 Nuñez ||  || Jorge I. Nunez (born 1981) is a scientist at the Johns Hopkins University Applied Physics Laboratory. He served as a LORRI Instrument Data Scientist for the New Horizons mission to Pluto. || 
|}

176701–176800 

|-id=710
| 176710 Banff ||  || The Canadian town of Banff located within the Banff National Park, is known for its hot springs and mountainous scenery, and one of the country's most popular tourist attractions. || 
|-id=711
| 176711 Canmore ||  || The town of Canmore, the most important coal-mining centers in southern Alberta || 
|}

176801–176900 

|-id=866
| 176866 Kuropatkin ||  || Nickolai Kuropatkin (born 1949), Russian-American physicist with the Sloan Digital Sky Survey || 
|-id=867
| 176867 Brianlee ||  || Brian C. Lee (born 1968), American physicist with the Sloan Digital Sky Survey || 
|-id=884
| 176884 Jallynsmith ||  || J. Allyn Smith (born 1954), American astronomer with the Sloan Digital Sky Survey || 
|}

176901–177000 

|-id=981
| 176981 Anteradonic ||  || Ante Radonić (born 1951) is a Croatian astronomer, who writes for the weekly radio show Andromeda and is a major contributor to the popularization of astronomy and astronautics in Croatia. || 
|}

References 

176001-177000